Nexø Stadion is the home ground of the Danish football club NB Bornholm.

Buildings and structures in Bornholm